City Power Johannesburg (or Joburg City Power) is a state owned power utility, wholly owned by the City of Johannesburg. Its responsibilities include buying electricity from power producers and supplying it to the public, and installing and maintaining the electrical infrastructure in the city of Johannesburg. It supplies electricity to 3.2 million people in the Greater Johannesburg Metropolitan Area.

History 
Joburg City Power was established as a separate company from the City of Johannesburg on 1 January 2000. On the 19th December 2001, the National Energy Regulator of South Africa (NERSA), granted City Power a licence to trade.

In 2022, it took over the electricity distribution functions from Eskom to Soweto and parts of Johannesburg, including Sandton, Orange Farm, Finetown, Ivory Park and Diepsloot; Eskom was previously responsible for supplying electricity to most parts of Johannesburg.

Corruption 
In 2013, a controversial R1.2 billion contract was awarded by the City of Johannesburg to Edison Power, a company owned by Vivian Reddy, a close ally of Jacob Zuma, for smart meters used by City Power customers. Edison Power was initially allocated a R600-million share of an R800-million contract. Subsequently, the contract value was revised to R1.25 billion and Edison Power received the exclusive contract.

Load shedding 

City Power currently obtains 90% of its power from Eskom and 10% from the Kelvin Power Station from which it seeks to move away from.

In 2014, it announced that it will remotely switch off geysers "to reduce the impact of load shedding. 

In 2021, it resolved to be an electricity generator to "reduce over-reliance on Eskom". In 2023, the City of Johannesburg along with City Power aimed to cut load shedding in Johannesburg by 3 stages through the use of smart meters and the recommissioning of two existing open cycle gas turbines. It also sought to secure power on a long-term basis from independent power producers (IPPs).

In 2023, City Power said it had to replace more than 390 mini-substations (pole-mounted transformers), at a cost of R200 million which constituted 80% of its budget for the year. The cause of this was load shedding, theft and vandalism.

Electricity procurement 
In 2023, through grid access it aims to obtain 53MW from customer-embedded rooftop solar generation and 3.7MW from municipal building PV generation, for a total of 60MW. 

By 2026/27, it hopes to target 480MW (with 200MW coming from households and businesses, 150MW from independent power producers on private and mining land, 50MW from financed rooftop IPP PV programmes, 27MW through municipal building PV generation, 33.5MW from landfill gas generation and solid waste-to-energy, and 20MW from natural gas generation.)

Revenue recuperation 
City Power has endeavoured to collect R8.9 billion owed by businesses and households. It did this by first giving notices of disconnecting the power of delinquent parties, and compelling them to pay. It said it will impose penalties on businesses and residential complexes that have defaulted on their accounts and connected electricity illegally. 

The Apartheid Museum was one of the disconnected clients, with it owing R1.8 million. The Gauteng Treasury was another, with it owing over R34 million. In February 2023, some of the disconnected clients were a shopping centre running an illegal connection on its meters and was penalised with a R100 000 fine, the Church of Scientology with R877 000 in arrears, a sports club in Bryanston which owed R2.3 million and the Nigerian consulate which owed R406 000.

See also 

 Johannesburg City Parks

References 

Government of Johannesburg
Government-owned companies of South Africa
Companies based in Johannesburg
2000 establishments in South Africa
Electric power companies of South Africa